is a member and the Vice Chairman of the Japanese Communist Party. He was a member of the House of Councillors from 2000 to 2010. In 1989, Ogata appealed to the Supreme Court of Japan to reopen a case where five officers were investigated for possible violations of the Telecommunications Enterprise Law after an eavesdropping device was found on his telephone line that was diverted to the apartment of the son of a police officer. Ogata is a supporter of the elimination of nuclear weapons.

References

Japanese Communist Party politicians
Japanese communists
Living people
Japanese anti–nuclear weapons activists
Year of birth missing (living people)